This is a list of members of the European Parliament for the United Kingdom in the 2009 to 2014 session, ordered by name.

See 2009 European Parliament election in the United Kingdom for further information on these elections in the UK, and 2009 European Parliament election for discussion on likely changes to the Parliamentary Groups.

Current members
This table can be sorted by constituency, party or party group: click the symbol at the top of the appropriate column.

Former members

Notes

2009
List
United Kingdom